Addison is a station on the Chicago Transit Authority's 'L' system, serving the Blue Line. It is also the only station whose coordinates are equal (3600 N/3600 W). It is the first station in the median of the Kennedy Expressway located between the Avondale neighborhood and Irving Park neighborhood. The Villa District is accessible by this station.

History
Addison station opened in 1970 as part of an extension of the West-Northwest route to Jefferson Park in the  median of the Kennedy Expressway, similar to that of Montrose station. During rush hour, trains bound for O'Hare Airport run every 4–10 minutes while trains headed for the Loop and Forest Park run every 3–10 minutes. From Addison station, trains take about 20 minutes to travel to the Loop.

Station renovation
In 2016, the station underwent renovations which added the elevator, making the station ADA accessible.

Bus connections
CTA
  152 Addison

Notes and references

Notes

References

External links

Addison (O'Hare Line) Station Page
Addison Street entrance from Google Maps Street View

CTA Blue Line stations
Railway stations in the United States opened in 1970